Events from the year 1664 in France

Incumbents
 Monarch – Louis XIV

Events
Compagnie de l'Occident established
Kronenbourg Brewery established in Strasbourg

Births
5 April – Élisabeth Thérèse de Lorraine, noblewoman (died 1748)
22 May – François Blouet de Camilly, clergyman (died 1723)
16 July – Philippe Charles, Duke of Valois, prince (died 1666)
31 August – Paul Lucas, merchant, naturalist, physician and antiquarian (died 1737)

Deaths

8 January – Moses Amyraut, Protestant theologian and metaphysician (born 1596)
17 November – Nicolas Perrot d'Ablancourt, translator (born 1606)

Full date of death missing
Michel Corneille the Elder, painter (born c.1601)
Charles Racquet, organist and composer (born 1597)
Antoine Singlin, Jansenist Catholic priest (born 1607)
David Derodon, Calvinist theologian and philosopher (born c.1600)

See also
Kronenbourg 1664, a beer

References

1660s in France